The Safran Silvercrest is a French turbofan  under development by Safran Aircraft Engines.

Development

The engine was announced at the 2006 National Business Aviation Association convention.
Certification was originally slated for the end of 2010 or early 2011.
In early 2008 the high pressure spool and combustor have been run in a US$120 million core-demonstrator called SM-X, reaching the take-off speed of 20,300rpm.

The First Engine To Test started ground testing in September 2012.
In May 2013, in-flight tests were targeted for the fourth quarter of the year.
They finally started in July 2014 on a Grumman Gulfstream II and should take place in Istres-Le Tubé Air Base.
In 2015, engine certification was rescheduled for late 2016.
In 2015, Safran passed €654 million of depreciation for amortization for the Silvercrest program.

In November 2016, issues were traced to airflow through the engine not as controlled as expected, a side-effect of the axial-centrifugal high-pressure compressor selection, controlling software was adapted to maintain a steady airflow and active clearance controls were added to the low pressure turbine ; in May 2017, altitude tests should begin soon in Russia for an early 2018 certification.
The  Silvercrest 2D was to power the Dassault Falcon 5X and the  2C the Cessna Citation Hemisphere, EASA certification was expected in spring 2018 and FAA certification in August 2018.

In October 2017, after Safran discovered high-pressure compressor response problems at high altitudes and low airspeeds on its flying testbed in San Antonio, Dassault announced the Falcon 5X introduction could be further delayed after 50 test flight hours, and do not rule out switching its engine supplier.
An axial-centrifugal high-pressure compressor is common below  but rare for the  range.
Textron Aviation declared that they were confident that these problems will be solved when it powers the Citation Hemisphere.
Until 2015, issues were mostly oil-fuel heat exchanger problems, carcass distortion and clearance control challenges of the high-pressure section.

Optimizing the settings, the control laws and positioning of the variable stator vanes will recover a part of the losses, but not all.
Flowpath will not be too modified and no stages or vanes will be added, the fixes selection will establish the length of the delay and the schedule will be revised before 2017 ends to recover all the surge margin and to operate as planned across the flight envelope.
The problem is due to the axial part, not the centrifugal, and is not related to the overall compressor architecture.
At this time the test engines had logged 800 flights, and the one concerned had 90 hours, including 30 hours on the ground and 60 hours in the air.

On 13 December 2017, Dassault abandoned the Silvercrest due to technical and schedule risks, ended the 5X development and launched a new Falcon with the same cross section, Pratt & Whitney Canada engines and a  range for a 2022 introduction.
Compliant Silvercrest engines were originally planned for the end of 2013 but technical issues led Safran to postpone them to the end of 2017, leading to delay the 5X introduction from 2017 to 2020, and the high pressure compressor issues in the fall of 2017 delayed it further with performance shortfalls, preventing a 2020 service entry.

In December 2017, Textron Aviation declared that the Silvercrest delays did not impact the Hemisphere programme with a first flight still planned in 2019 and an introduction after 2020 and Textron confirmed its selection for the Hemisphere after Dassault cancelled the 5X. However, in April 2018, they declared that they suspended the Hemisphere Program because of the ongoing problems with the Silvercrest engine.

In May 2018, Safran announced it had launched a high-pressure compressor redesign for a go-ahead decision by the middle of 2019, after testing, shelving the Hemisphere program if problems cannot be fixed.
The redesigned compressor will be tested in July 2019 to prove the engine operation.
By October 2018, Safran had amassed over 9,000 test hours and 300 in flight.
Safran needs a second customer to justify its investment, but is still optimistic for the engine's future.

In July 2019, Textron suspended the Cessna Citation Hemisphere development as its turbofans did not meet objectives: the new high pressure compressor exceeded expectations during ground tests but further trials are necessary to "confirm engine improvements and complete overall engine performance and durability validation" and Safran will continue the effort as an "R&T platform".
For Safran, insufficient skills retention is causing the repetition of technical issues as design engineers retire.

Design 

It was originally designed as an  thrust turbofan.

The two-shaft engine architecture includes a  fan with solid wide-chord swept blades, followed by 4 booster stages, all driven by a 4-stage low pressure turbine. The high pressure spool has 4 axial compressor stages and 1 centrifugal stage, driven by a single-stage turbine.
An axi-centrifugal compressor is unusual for an engine in this thrust range.
Turbomeca, which like Snecma is a part of the SAFRAN Group, participates in the design of the centrifugal compressor stage.

Design in 2007 featured a smaller 40-inch fan, no booster, one more high-pressure compressor stage, one low-pressure turbine stage less and a lower 4.5 bypass ratio, a 27:1 overall pressure ratio and a core pressure ratio of "over 17".

Applications
Silvercrest 2C
Textron announced the suspension of the program in April 2018.

Silvercrest SC-2D
Dassault announced the cancellation of the 5X program on 13 December 2017. On 6 September 2018, Dassault Aviation and Safran ended with US$280 million in compensatory damages paid by Safran.

Specifications (2D)

See also

References

External links

 
 

High-bypass turbofan engines
2010s turbofan engines
Silvercrest